"The End of the Innocence" is the lead single and title track from Don Henley's third solo studio album of the same name, released in 1989. Henley co-wrote and co-produced the song with Bruce Hornsby, who also performed piano; both artists perform the song live in their respective concerts. The single peaked at number eight on the US Billboard Hot 100, becoming his fifth solo top-10 hit on the chart. "The End of the Innocence" also became his fourth number-one single on the Album Rock Tracks chart. In Canada, it reached number three on the RPM Top Singles and Adult Contemporary charts. The song received Grammy nominations for Record of the Year and Song of the Year.

Music video
The black-and-white music video for the song was directed by future film director David Fincher (Alien 3, Seven, Fight Club) and earned Henley an MTV Video Music Award for Best Male Video in 1990.

Henley ensured there would be two political comments in the video.  At the line "armchair warriors often fail," it shows a TV set showing scenes of the congressional testimony of Oliver North.  At the line "they're beating plowshares into swords, for this tired old man that we elected king," it shows a series of posters of President Ronald Reagan.

Personnel 
 Don Henley – vocals, drums 
 Bruce Hornsby – acoustic piano, additional keyboards 
 Jai Winding – keyboard bass 
 Michael Fisher – percussion 
 Wayne Shorter – soprano sax solo

Charts

Weekly charts

Year-end charts

See also
 Ronald Reagan in music

References

1989 singles
1989 songs
Black-and-white music videos
Don Henley songs
Geffen Records singles
MTV Video Music Award for Best Male Video
Political songs
Music videos directed by David Fincher
Ronald Reagan
Songs written by Bruce Hornsby
Songs written by Don Henley